Paulo Miguel Gomes Ferreira (born 24 August 2000) known as Paulinho, is a Portuguese footballer who plays as a forward. He is under contract with Swiss club Grasshoppers, where he is assigned to the Under-21 squad, which plays in the fourth-tier 1. Liga.

Football career
He made his professional debut for Estoril on 10 September 2020 in the Liga Portugal 2.

References

External links

2000 births
Living people
Footballers from Lisbon
Portuguese footballers
Portugal youth international footballers
Association football forwards
G.D. Estoril Praia players
Grasshopper Club Zürich players
Liga Portugal 2 players
Swiss 1. Liga (football) players
Portuguese expatriate footballers
Expatriate footballers in Switzerland
Portuguese expatriate sportspeople in Switzerland